Sundbyvester is one of the 15 administrative, statistical, and tax city districts (bydele) comprising the municipality of Copenhagen, Denmark.  It lies on the south border of the municipality on the island of Amager.  It covers an area of 5.21 km², has a population of 38,017 and a population density of 7,302 per km².

Neighboring city districts are as follows:
 to the northeast is Sundbyøster 
 to the north is Christianshavn, separated from Syndbyvester by Stadsgraven (the city moat)
 to the west is Vestamager 
 to the south is Tårnby municipality, which is outside of the Copenhagen municipality area

External links 
 City of Copenhagen’s statistical office

Copenhagen city districts